Abraham "Bram" Cornelis Willem Leenards (born 14 June 1940) is a retired Dutch water polo player. He was part of the Dutch teams that placed eighth at the 1960 and 1964 Summer Olympics.

References

1940 births
Living people
Dutch male water polo players
Olympic water polo players of the Netherlands
Water polo players at the 1960 Summer Olympics
Water polo players at the 1964 Summer Olympics
Sportspeople from The Hague
20th-century Dutch people